The Complete Dictionary of Arts and Sciences was an encyclopedia edited by Temple Henry Croker. It is notable for being published in Coventry – the first English encyclopedia published outside London.
 
Publication began in April 1765 with the issuance of the first of what were eventually 150 three-page sheets that were eventually collected into a folio dated 1764–1766.

Other contributors included Thomas Williams, MD, who provided articles on medicine, anatomy and chemistry, and Samuel Clark who provided articles on mathematics. Nevertheless, the work was largely a plagiarization of Ephraim Chambers' Cyclopaedia, or a Universal Dictionary of Arts and Sciences.

References

External links
The complete dictionary of arts and sciences. In which the whole circle of human learning is explained, and the difficulties attending the acquisition of every art, whether liberal or mechanical, are removed, in the most easy and familiar manner, vol. I.
The complete dictionary of arts and sciences. In which the whole circle of human learning is explained, and the difficulties attending the acquisition of every art, whether liberal or mechanical, are removed, in the most easy and familiar manner, vol. II.
The complete dictionary of arts and sciences. In which the whole circle of human learning is explained, and the difficulties attending the acquisition of every art, whether liberal or mechanical, are removed, in the most easy and familiar manner, vol. III.

1765 books
18th-century encyclopedias
British encyclopedias
English-language encyclopedias